A civil union (also known as a civil partnership) is a legally recognized arrangement similar to marriage, created primarily as a means to provide recognition in law for same-sex couples. Civil unions grant some or all of the rights of marriage except child adoption and/or the title itself.

Civil unions under one name or another have been established by law in several, mostly developed, countries in order to provide legal recognition of relationships formed by unmarried same-sex couples and to afford them rights, benefits, tax breaks, and responsibilities similar or identical to those of legally married couples. In 1989, Denmark was the first country to legalise civil unions, for same-sex couples; however most other developed democracies did not begin establishing civil unions until the 1990s or early 2000s, often developing them from less formal domestic partnerships. While civil unions are often established for both opposite-sex couples and same-sex couples, in a number of countries they are available to same-sex couples only. In Brazil, civil unions were first created for opposite-sex couples in 2002, and then expanded to include same-sex couples through a supreme court ruling in 2011. In the majority of countries that established same-sex civil unions, they have since been either supplemented or replaced by same-sex marriage. Civil unions are viewed by LGBT rights campaigners as a "first step" towards establishing same-sex marriage, as civil unions are viewed by supporters of LGBT rights as a "separate but equal" or "second class" status.

Many jurisdictions with civil unions recognize foreign unions if those are essentially equivalent to their own; for example, the United Kingdom lists equivalent unions in the Civil Partnership Act 2004 Schedule 20. The marriages of same-sex couples performed abroad may be recognized as civil unions in jurisdictions that only have the latter.

Overview and terminology

The terms used to designate civil unions are not standardized, and vary widely from country to country.  Government-sanctioned relationships that may be similar or equivalent to civil unions include civil partnerships, registered partnerships, domestic partnerships, significant relationships, reciprocal beneficiary relationships, common-law marriage, adult interdependent relationships, life partnerships, stable unions, civil solidarity pacts, and so on.  The exact level of rights, benefits, obligations, and responsibilities also varies, depending on the laws of a particular country.  Some jurisdictions allow same-sex couples to adopt, while others forbid them to do so, or allow adoption only in specified circumstances.

In the United States, the term civil union was introduced in the state of Vermont in 2000 to connote a status equivalent to marriage for same-sex couples; it was chosen by the state's legislators in preference to phrases such as  "domestic partner relationship" or "civil accord".

Domestic partnership, offered by some states, counties, cities, and employers since as early as 1985, has generally connoted a lesser status with fewer benefits.  However, the legislatures of the West Coast states of California, Oregon and Washington have preferred the term domestic partnership for enactments similar or equivalent to civil union laws in East Coast states.

Civil unions are not seen as a replacement for marriage by many in the LGBT community. "Marriage in the United States is a civil union; but a civil union, as it has come to be called, is not marriage", said Evan Wolfson of Freedom to Marry.  "It is a proposed hypothetical legal mechanism, since it doesn't exist in most places, to give some of the protections but also withhold something precious from gay people. There's no good reason to do that."  However, some opponents of same-sex marriage claim that civil unions rob marriage of its unique status; Randy Thomasson, executive director of the Campaign for California Families, calls civil unions "homosexual marriage by another name" and contends that civil unions provide same-sex couples "all the rights of marriage available under state law".  The California Supreme Court, in the In Re Marriage Cases decision, noted nine differences in state law.

Civil unions are commonly criticised as being 'separate but equal'; critics such as former New Zealand MP and feminist Marilyn Waring note that same-sex couples remain excluded from the right to marry and are forced to use a separate institution. Supporters of same-sex marriage contend that treating same-sex couples differently from other couples under the law allows for inferior treatment and that if civil unions were the same as marriage there would be no reason for two separate laws. A New Jersey commission which reviewed the state's civil union law reported that the law "invites and encourages unequal treatment of same-sex couples and their children". Some have suggested that creating civil unions which are open to opposite-sex couples would avoid the accusations of apartheid.

Proponents of civil unions say that they provide practical equality for same-sex couples and solve the problems over areas such as hospital visitation rights and transfer of property caused by lack of legal recognition. Proponents also say that creating civil unions is a more pragmatic way to ensure that same-sex couples have legal rights as it avoids the more controversial issues surrounding marriage and the claim that the term has a religious source.

Many supporters of same-sex marriage state that the word 'marriage' matters and that the term 'civil union' (and its equivalents) do not convey the emotional meaning or bring the respect that comes with marriage. Former US Solicitor General and attorney in the Perry v. Schwarzenegger case Theodore Olsen said that recognizing same-sex couples under the term 'domestic partnership' stigmatizes gay people's relationships, treating them as if they were "something akin to a commercial venture, not a loving union". Many also contend that the fact that civil unions are often not understood can cause difficulty for same-sex couples in emergency situations.

List of jurisdictions recognizing same-sex unions but not same-sex marriage
As of August 13, 2022, the states that provide civil unions but not marriage for same-sex couples are:
 
 Bolivia
 Croatia
 Cyprus
 Czech Republic
 Estonia
 Greece
 Hungary
 Italy
 Latvia
 Liechtenstein
 Monaco
 Montenegro
 the Netherlands state of Aruba
 San Marino
 the British territories of Bermuda and Cayman Islands

List of jurisdictions recognizing same-sex unions

The following is a list of countries and other jurisdictions which have established civil unions for same-sex couples or opposite-sex couples, categorized by continent, with the year in which the law establishing civil unions in the listed country or other jurisdiction came into effect in brackets:

Africa 

  (2006, civil partnership)
 
  (2007)
  (1999)
 
  (2003)
  (1998)
   (2008)

Americas 

 : (2015)
  (2003)
  (2003)
 City of  Villa Carlos Paz (2007)
 City of  Río Cuarto (2009)
  (2011, opposite sex since 2003)
 :
  (2004, common-law relationships)
  (2001, domestic partnership)
  (2002)
  (2003, adult interdependent relationships)
  (2015)
  (2009)
  (1995)
  (2014)
 
  (1999)
  (1999)
  (1999)
  (1999)
  (1999)
  (1999)
 :
  (2007)
  Mexico City (2007)
  (2013)
  (2015)
  (2017)
  (2020)
  (2021)
  Netherlands:
  (2012)
  (2021)
  United Kingdom:
  (2017, civil partnership)
  (2018, domestic partnership)
  (2020, civil partnership)
 :
  (reciprocal beneficiary relationships since 1997, civil unions since 2012)
  (1999, domestic partnership)
  (2002, domestic partnership)
  (2004, domestic partnership)
  (domestic partnership since 2004, civil union since 2006)
  (2007, domestic partnership)
  (2008, domestic partnership)
  (2008, domestic partnership)
  (designated beneficiary agreement since 2009, civil union since 2013)
  (2009, domestic partnership)
  (2011, civil union)
 Several counties
  (2008)

Asia 

 
  Shibuya, Tokyo (2015)
  Setagaya, Tokyo (2015)
  Iga, Mie (2016)
  Takarazuka, Hyōgo (2016)
  Naha, Okinawa (2016)
  Sapporo, Hokkaido (2017)
  Fukuoka, Fukuoka (2018)
  Osaka, Osaka (2018)
  Nakano, Tokyo (2018)
  Ōizumi, Gunma (2019)
  Chiba, Chiba (2019)
  Edogawa, Tokyo (2019)
  Fuchū, Tokyo (2019)
  Hirakata, Osaka (2019)
  Kumamoto, Kumamoto (2019)
  Odawara, Kanagawa (2019)
  Sakai, Osaka (2019)
  Sōja, Okayama (2019)
  Toshima, Tokyo (2019)
  Yokosuka, Kanagawa (2019)
  Kanuma, Tochigi (2019)
  Miyazaki, Miyazaki (2019)
  Kitakyushu, Fukuoka (2019)
  Narashino, Chiba (2020)
  Hida, Gifu (TBD)
 
 Special municipalities (6/6)
  Kaohsiung (2015)
  Taipei (2015)
  Taichung (2015)
  Tainan (2016)
  New Taipei (2016)
  Taoyuan (2016)
 Provincial cities (3/3)
  Chiayi (2016)
  Hsinchu (2017)
  Keelung (2017)
 Counties (9/13)
  Changhua County (2016)
  Hsinchu County (2016)
  Yilan County (2016)
  Chiayi County (2016)
  Kinmen County (2017)
  Lienchiang County (2017)
  Miaoli County (2017)
 Nantou County (2017)
  Pingtung County (2017)

Europe 

  (1998)
 :
  (1998)
  (1999)
  (2000)
  (2000)
  (2001)
  (2002)
  (2002)
  (2002)
  (2002)
  (2002)
  (2003)
  (2003)
  (2005)
  (2008)
  (2010)
  (2018)
  (1999)
  (2000)
  (2001) opposite-sex since 1999.
  (2004)
  (2005, civil partnership)
  (2011, civil partnership)
  (2012, civil partnerships)
  (2014, civil partnerships)
  (2006)
  (2006)
  (2007)
  (2001)
  (2002)
  (2004)
  (2005)
  (2009)
  (2010)
  (2011)
  (2014)
  (2014)
  (2015)
  (2015) opposite-sex since 2008.
  (2016)
  (2016)
  (2018)
  (2020)
  (2021)
  (2022)
  (2022)

Oceania 

 :
  (2004, significant relationships and caring relationships)
  (domestic partnership since 2007, registered relationships since 2017)
  (domestic relationships since 1994)
  (2008) (domestic relationship)
  (de facto couples since 1999, registered relationships since 2010)
  (de facto recognition since 1999, civil partnerships since 2012)
  (2005) (civil union)
 
  (2009)
  (2009)

Countries with former civil unions 

Several countries used to offer civil unions only for same-sex couples. The laws that allowed civil unions were repealed when same-sex marriage was legalized. The following is a list of countries and other jurisdictions that used to offer civil unions for same-sex couples with the years in which they were available in brackets:

Europe 
  (1989–2012)
  (1996–2016)
  (1993–2008)
  (1995–2009)
  (1996–2010)
  (2001–2017)
  (2002–2017)
  (2010–2015, civil partnership)

Americas 
 :
  (2000–2009, civil unions)
  (2005–2010, civil unions)
  (2008–2010, civil unions)
  (2009–2018, domestic partnerships)
  (2011–2013, civil unions)
  (2011–2013, civil unions)
 :
  (2013–2016)
  (2014–2018)

Oceania 
 :
   (civil partnerships between 2008 and 2012; civil unions between 2012 and 2017)

Case studies

Argentina

Since 2003, the Argentine province of Río Negro and the city of Buenos Aires allow domestic partnerships. The City of Villa Carlos Paz (Córdoba) allowed it from 2007. Since 2009, the city of Río Cuarto (Córdoba) allows Civil Unions.

Australia

All levels of Australian Governments under nearly all Australian statutes do recognise same-sex couples as de facto couples as unregistered co-habitation or de facto status since 2009. From 1 July 2009 Centrelink recognised same-sex couples equally regarding social security – under the common-law marriage, de facto status or unregistered cohabitation.

Registered relationship recognition in state Governments:

Registered relationship recognition in 5 local government areas within Australia:
 City of Sydney, New South WalesRegistered relationships since 2004
 Municipality of Woollahra, New South WalesRegistered relationships since 2008
 City of the Blue Mountains, New South WalesRegistered relationships since 2010
 City of Vincent, Western AustraliaRegistered relationships since 2012
 Town of Port Hedland, Western AustraliaRegistered relationships since 2015.

Brazil

Cohabitation grants 112 benefits as family entities in Brazil since 2002. It is known as  when both parts are legally authorized to marry, and as  when at least one party is legally prohibited from doing so. Cohabitation grants all rights marriage confers, with the exception of automatic opt-in for one of four systems of property share married couples have access to, and automatic right to inheritance.

Same-sex stable cohabitation in Brazil is legally recognized nationwide since May 5, 2011. Brazil's Supreme Court voted 10–0 with one abstention to allow same-sex couples the same legal rights as married couples, following pointed recognition of such relationships that dates as far back as 2004. The ruling gave same-sex couples in such relationships the same financial and social rights enjoyed by those in mixed-sex ones.

A union between two women and one man was reported in August 2012, though its legality was doubted.

Canada

In Canada:
 Domestic partnerships in Nova Scotia (2001),
 Civil unions in Quebec (2002),
 Common-law relationships in Manitoba (2002), and
 Adult interdependent relationships in Alberta (2003)
were extended to same-sex couples before the enactment (2005) nationwide of same-sex marriage in Canada.

Another notable attempt to extend civil union rights, the Equality Rights Statute Amendment Act in Ontario, was defeated in 1994.

Colombia

In 2007, Colombia came close to passing a law granting legal recognition to same-sex couples, but the bill failed on final passage in one house of the national legislature. However, a court decision in October 2007 extended social security and health insurance rights to same-sex couples. On January 29, 2009, the Constitutional Court ruled that cohabitating same-sex couples must be given all rights offered to unmarried heterosexual couples, making Colombia the first Latin American country to fully grant this right to all its citizens. Couples can claim these rights after living together for two years. Colombia has since approved same-sex marriage.

Costa Rica

The Legislative Assembly of Costa Rica passed a bill in early July 2013 that "confers social rights and benefits of a civil union, free from discrimination", language inserted by lawmaker José María Villalta Florez-Estrada of the Broad Front party. After the bill passed, several media outlets reported that conservative lawmakers realized the bill's implications for same-sex unions and urged President Laura Chinchilla, who is set to face Villalta in the 2014 presidential election, to use her veto power to stop the bill from becoming law. Chinchilla, who has suggested the courts should determine the legality of same-sex unions in Costa Rica, refused and signed the bill into law on 4 July. A gay couple has filed an appeal with the Supreme Court of Justice of Costa Rica asking that their union be recognized under the new law. Gay rights activists reacting to the law said it needs to survive a constitutional challenge in court. Some constitutional lawyers stated that same-sex couples will "still lack legal capacity" to formalize their unions, despite passage of the bill.

Ecuador

The 2008 Constitution of Ecuador enacted civil unions between two people without regard to gender, giving same-sex couples the same rights as legally married heterosexual couples except for the right to adopt.

Europe

In Europe:

 Denmark (1989–2012; same-sex only)
 Norway (1993–2009; same-sex only)
 Sweden (1995–2009; same-sex only)
 Iceland (1996–2010; same-sex only)
 Greenland (1996–2016; same-sex only)
 Netherlands (1998; gender-neutral)
 France (1999; gender-neutral)
 Belgium (2000; gender-neutral)
 Germany (2001–2017; same-sex only)
 Finland (2002–2017; same-sex only)
 Luxembourg (2004; gender-neutral)
 Andorra (2005; gender-neutral)
 United Kingdom (2005; same-sex only, since 2019 gender-neutral in England and Wales, since 2020 gender-neutral in Northern Ireland, since 2021 in Scotland)
 Czech Republic (2006; same-sex only)
 Slovenia (2006; same-sex only)
 Switzerland (2007–2022; same-sex only)
 Greece (2008; initially opposite-sex only, since 2015 gender-neutral)
 Hungary (2009; same-sex only)
 Austria (2010; same-sex only, since 2019 gender-neutral)
 Ireland (2011–2015; same-sex only)
 Isle of Man (2011; same-sex only, since 2016 gender-neutral)
 Liechtenstein (2011; same-sex only)
 Jersey (2012; same-sex only)
 Gibraltar (2014; gender-neutral)
 Malta (2014; gender-neutral)
 Croatia (2014; same-sex only)
 Andorra (2014; same-sex only)
 Cyprus (2015; gender-neutral)
 Estonia (2016; gender-neutral)
 Italy (2016; same-sex only)
 San Marino (2018; gender-neutral)
 Monaco (2020, gender-neutral)
 Montenegro (2021; same-sex only)

Andorra

Austria

In 2018, Minister of Justice Josef Moser announced that both marriage and registered partnership would be open to homosexuals and heterosexuals. This occurred because Helga Ratzenböck and Martin Seydl have been appealing for years in court for a registered civil partnership in Austria. At the European Court of Human Rights in Strasbourg they attempted to sue Austria for discrimination against their sexuality, because they were a heterosexual couple and were excluded from the benefits of registered partnership, but this failed.

Croatia

Cyprus

Czech Republic

Denmark

Civil unions were introduced in Denmark by law on 7 June 1989, the world's first such law, and came into effect on 1 October 1989. On 7 June 2012, the law was replaced by a new same-sex marriage law, which came into effect on 15 June 2012.

Registered partnership was by civil ceremony only, but the Church of Denmark allowed priests to perform blessings of same-sex couples, as it stated that the church blesses people, not institutions. The new law makes same-sex marriages in churches possible, but allows vicars to decline marriages of same-sex couples in their church.

On 17 March 2009, the Folketing introduced a bill that gave same-sex couples in registered partnerships the right to adopt jointly. This bill was approved on 4 May 2010 and took effect on 1 July 2010.

Estonia

France

The French law providing benefits to same-sex couples also applies to opposite-sex couples who choose this form of partnership over marriage.  Known as the "Pacte civil de solidarité" (PACS), it is more easily dissolved than the divorce process applying to marriage.  Tax benefits accrue immediately (only from 2007 on), while immigration benefits accrue only after the contract has been in effect for one year. The partners are required to have a common address, making it difficult for foreigners to use this law as a means to a residence permit, and difficult for French citizens to gain the right to live with a foreign partnerespecially since the contract does not automatically give immigration rights, as marriage does.

Between 2000 and 2010, the number of marriages decreased while the number of PACS strongly increased. In 2010, there were 3 PACS for every 4 marriages celebrated in France. Especially amongst heterosexual couples PACS is very popular, with 96 out of 100 PACS couples being heterosexual in the year 2019.

Germany

Civil unions in Germany began in 2001.

In 2017, registered civil partnership was replaced with marriage, with any couple regardless of sex allowed to marry.

Greece

Greek parliament voted in favor of a Cohabitation Pact (Greek: Σύμφωνο Συμβίωσης) giving almost the same rights as marriage to couples regardless of their sex. The draft was approved in the relevant Greek parliament committee and during voting on 22 December 2015, the law was passed with 194 positive votes (out of 300).

Hungary
Civil unions in Hungary began in 2009.

Iceland
Iceland does not have a comprehensive legal act on civil unions. Instead, various laws deal with civil unions and their meaning. When Iceland legalised same-sex marriages in 2010, the Act on Registered Partnerships (87/1996) was abolished. Registered partnerships had been the principal legal unions for same-sex partners since the law was passed in 1996.

Ireland
In 2010, the lower house of the Irish Parliament Dáil Éireann passed the bill on Civil Partnerships unanimously. This bill allows civil partnerships of same-sex couples, and establishes an extensive package of rights, obligations and protections for same-sex couples who register as civil partners. The bill passed all stages of in both Houses of the Oireachtas, and came into effect on 1 January 2011.  The first partnership between two men was registered on 7 February 2011.

Same-sex marriage has been legal in Ireland since 2015 following a referendum.

Italy
Civil unions in Italy began in 2016.

Liechtenstein
Civil unions in Liechtenstein began in 2011.

Monaco 
Civil unions in Monaco began in 2020.

Montenegro
Civil unions in Montenegro began in 2020.

Netherlands
In 2001, the Netherlands passed a law allowing same-sex couples to marry, in addition to its 1998 "registered partnership" law (civil union) for both same-sex and opposite-sex couples.

Poland
In 2004, Senator Maria Szyszkowska proposed a bill which would legalize same-sex civil unions in Poland. The project was approved by the Senate but was never voted upon by the Sejm, as Włodzimierz Cimoszewicz (then the Marshal of the Sejm) did not bring it for the deliberation.

In 2008, when asked about same-sex civil unions, First Cabinet of Donald Tusk spokeswoman Agnieszka Liszka answered: "Council of Ministers did not and would not take care of that matter."

On January 25, 2013, Sejm voted upon three separate bills regarding same-sex civil unions in Poland: by the centre-left Democratic Left Alliance, liberal Palikot's Movement and centre-right Civic Platform. The first bill had 283 against, 137 for, 30 abstaining. The second had 276 against, 150 for, 23 abstaining. The third had 228 against, 211 for, 10 abstaining. All three were rejected, mainly with the votes of centre-right, right-wing and conservative parties: Polish People's Party, Law and Justice and United Poland. A majority of deputies from the ruling centre-right Civic Platform also voted against the first two bills. The Roman Catholic Church in Poland, Polish Orthodox Church and Polish Muslims opposed all three bills.

In March 2013, Prime Minister Donald Tusk officially stated that a new project of civil unions bill would be presented to the parliament "in two months time" (in May 2013), but  no such initiatives took place.

In a 2013 opinion poll conducted by CBOS, 68% of Poles were against gays and lesbians publicly showing their way of life, 65% of Poles were against same-sex civil unions, 72% were against same-sex marriage and 88% were against adoption by same-sex couples.

In December 2014, the Sejm refused to deal with a civil partnership bill proposed by Your Movement, with 235 MPs voting against debating the bill, and 185 MPs voting for.

In May 2015, the Sejm again refused to deal with the topic, with 215 MPs voting against and only 146 for. The Prime Minister, Ewa Kopacz, said that civil partnerships are an issue for the next parliament to deal with.

San Marino

Slovenia

Switzerland

The Canton of Geneva has a law on the cantonal level, the Partenariat cantonal (the Cantonal Domestic Partnership), since 2001. It grants unmarried couples, whether same-sex or opposite-sex, many of the rights, responsibilities and protections that married couples have. However, it does not allow benefits in taxation, social security, or health insurance premiums (unlike the federal law). Geneva was the first Canton to recognise same-sex couples through this law.

On September 22, 2002, voters in the Swiss canton of Zurich voted to extend a number of marriage rights to same-sex partners, including tax, inheritance, and social security benefits. The law is limited to same-sex couples, and both partners must have lived in the canton for six months and formally commit to running a household together and supporting and aiding each another.

On November 12, 2003, the Constituent assembly of the Canton of Fribourg granted Registered Partnership as a constitutional right under the Article 14.

On January 27, 2004, the Canton of Neuchâtel voted for a law on the cantonal level, the Partenariat enregistré (the Cantonal Registered Partnership). It grants unmarried couples, whether same-sex or opposite-sex, the same rights as married couple for cantonal matters such as responsibilities and protections, benefits in taxation, social security, or health insurance premiums.

On June 5, 2005, voters extended this right to the whole of Switzerland through a federal referendum. This was the first time that the civil union laws were affirmed in a nationwide referendum in any country. The Federal Domestic Partnership Law, reserved for same-sex couples, came into force on January 1, 2007. It grants the same rights as marriage, but full joint adoption rights, facilitated naturalization and medically assisted procreation are explicitly forbidden for same-sex domestic partners.

In 2017, the Federal Councilor Simonetta Sommaruga addressed the issue that civil union is not open yet for heterosexual couples, in collaboration with experts at the University of Bern. In Geneva and Neuchâtel a type of civil union called cantonal PACS is available to opposite-sex and same-sex couples.

On September 26, 2021, the people of Switzerland approved on national referendum the initiative "Marriage for all", which would grant marriage and adoption rights for same-sex couples. This initiative would be made effective on July 1, 2022.

United Kingdom

In 2003, the British government announced plans to introduce civil partnerships which would allow same-sex couples the rights and responsibilities resulting from marriage. The Civil Partnership Bill was introduced into the House of Lords on 30 March 2004. After considering amendments made by the House of Commons, it was passed by the House of Lords, its final legislative hurdle, on 17 November 2004, and received royal assent on 18 November. The Act came into force on 5 December 2005, and same-sex, but not opposite-sex, couples were able to form the civil partnerships from 19 December 2005 in Northern Ireland, 20 December 2005 in Scotland and 21 December 2005 in England and Wales. Separate provisions were included in the first Finance Act 2005 to allow regulations to be made to amend tax laws to give the same tax advantages and disadvantages to couples in civil partnerships as apply to married couples. At that time, the Church of England, the state church in England, permitted clergy to enter into same-sex civil partnerships.

Aside from the manner in which couples register and the non-use of the word "marriage", civil partnerships grant most of the same legal rights as marriage and generally operate under the same constrictions (one difference being that marriage requires dissolution by divorce while a civil union does not). It is not legal to be in both a civil partnership and a marriage at the same time. Nevertheless, some of those in favour of legal same-sex marriage object that civil partnerships do not grant full equality.

Both same-sex marriages and civil unions of other nations will be automatically considered civil partnerships under UK law providing they came within Section 20 of the Act. This means, in some cases, non-Britons from nations with civil unions will have greater rights in the UK than in their native countries. For example, a Vermont civil union would have legal standing in the UK; however, in cases where one partner was American and the other British, the Vermont civil union would not provide the Briton with right of abode in Vermont (or any other US state or territory), whereas it would provide the American with right of abode in the UK.

In September 2011, the succeeding coalition government announced its intention to legalise same-sex marriage in England and Wales by 2015 at the latest. The future status of civil partnerships is unclear. The Scottish Government, which has devolved responsibility for such legislation, held a consultation concerning both civil and religious same sex marriage in the autumn of 2011. Legislation to allow same-sex marriage in England and Wales was passed by the Parliament of the United Kingdom in July 2013 and came into force on 13 March 2014, and the first same-sex marriages took place on 29 March 2014. The first same-sex marriages in Scotland took place in December 2014.

In June 2018, the Supreme Court ruled that restricting civil partnerships to same-sex couples was discriminatory. In response, the Prime Minister announced in October 2018 that civil partnerships would be opened to heterosexual couples.

Mexico

On 9 November 2006, Mexico City's unicameral Legislative Assembly passed and approved (43–17) a bill legalizing same-sex civil unions, under the name Ley de Sociedades de Convivencia (Law for Co-existence Partnerships), which became effective on 16 March 2007. The law gives property and inheritance rights to same-sex couples. On 11 January 2007, the northern state of Coahuila, which borders Texas, passed a similar bill (20–13), under the name Pacto Civil de Solidaridad (Civil Pact of Solidarity). Unlike Mexico City's law, once same-sex couples have registered in Coahuila, the state protects their rights no matter where they live in the country. Twenty days after the law had passed, the country's first same-sex civil union took place in Saltillo, Coahuila. Civil unions have been proposed in at least six states since 2006.

In Colima, governor Mario Anguiano Moreno has agreed to discuss the legalization of civil unions and adoption by same-sex couples. In Jalisco, local congress approved on 31 October 2013 the Free Coexistence Act, which allows the performance of civil unions in the state.

New Zealand

On 9 December 2004 the New Zealand Parliament passed the Civil Union Bill, establishing civil unions for same-sex and opposite-sex couples. The debate over Civil Unions was highly divisive in New Zealand, inspiring great public emotion both for and against the passing. A companion bill, the Relationships (Statutory References) Bill was passed shortly thereafter to remove discriminatory provisions on the basis of relationship status from a range of statutes and regulations. As a result of these bills, all couples in New Zealand, whether married, in a civil union, or in a de facto partnership, now generally enjoy the same rights and undertake the same obligations. These rights extend to immigration, next-of-kin status, social welfare, matrimonial property and other areas.

The Civil Union Act 2004 came into effect on 26 April 2005 with the first unions able to occur from Friday 29 April 2005.

South Africa

In South Africa, a "civil union" is either a marriage or a civil partnership, although confusingly the term "civil union" is commonly used when "civil partnership" is meant. Same-sex and opposite-sex couples may register their unions either as marriages or as civil partnerships. In laws where "marriage" is mentioned, its definition now retroactively includes civil partnerships.

United States

The first civil unions in the United States were offered by the state of Vermont in 2000. The federal government does not recognize these unions. By the end of 2006, Connecticut and New Jersey had also enacted civil union laws; New Hampshire followed in 2007. Furthermore, California's domestic partnership law had been expanded to the point that it became practically a civil union law as well. The same might be said for domestic partnership in the District of Columbia, domestic partnership in Washington, and domestic partnership in Oregon.

Jurisdictions in the U.S. that offer civil unions or domestic partnerships granting nearly all of the state-recognized rights of marriage to same-sex couples include:
 Domestic partnership in California (2000 – expanded over time)
 Domestic partnership in the District of Columbia (1992 law implemented, 2002 became effective – expanded over time)
 Civil union in Hawaii (2012)
 Civil union in Illinois (2011)
 Domestic partnership in Nevada (2009)
 Civil union in New Jersey (2007)
 Domestic partnership in Oregon (2008)
 Civil union in Rhode Island (2011)
 Domestic partnership in Washington State (2007 – expanded over time)

States in the U.S. with domestic partnerships or similar status granting some of the rights of marriage include:
 Designated beneficiary agreement in Colorado (2009)
 Reciprocal beneficiary relationship in Hawaii (1997)
 Domestic partnership in Maine (2004)

Since October 2014, all states that provide for civil unions, domestic partnerships, or similar arrangements between same-sex partners also allow same-sex partners to legally wed.

Arizona 

In 2013, Bisbee became the first city in Arizona to legalize civil unions for same-sex couples. After its passage, the state's Attorney General, Tom Horne, threatened to challenge the law in court, arguing that it violated the state's constitution. However, the Attorney General agreed to withdraw the challenge after Bisbee amended the law, and the civil union ordinance was approved.

Following Bisbee, also in 2013, Tucson became the second municipality to legalize civil unions. Jerome followed in the same year. Also in 2013, Clarkdale and Cottonwood were the next cities in the Verde Valley to pass civil unions. A measure to allow civil unions failed in Camp Verde by a split 3–3 vote in the city council making it the only city in the Verde Valley to not have passed the bill.

Sedona passed civil unions in September 2013. The city of Tempe considered legal advice about a civil union ordinance, but it did not pass a bill. After the legalization of same-sex marriage in Arizona, civil unions may continue to be registered in the cities that had legalized the ordinances.

California

In California, where domestic partnership (DP) has been available to same-sex and certain opposite-sex couples since 2000, a wholesale revision of the law in 2005 made it substantially equivalent to marriage at the state level.  In 2007, the Legislature took a further step when it required same-sex DP couples to file state income taxes jointly.  (Couples must continue to file federal taxes as individuals.)  In the May 2008 In re Marriage Cases decision, the state supreme court noted nine differences between Domestic Partnerships and same-sex marriage in state law, including a cohabitation requirement for domestic partners, access to CalPERS long-term care insurance (but not CalPERS in general), and the lack of an equivalent to California's "confidential marriage" institution. The cohabitation requirement was dropped on January 1, 2012, and a "confidential option" for domestic partners became available the same day.

Colorado
A bill to establish civil unions for same-sex and opposite-sex couples passed both chambers of the Colorado legislature and was signed into law by Governor John Hickenlooper. Civil unions began on May 1, 2013.

Connecticut

In 2005, the Connecticut General Assembly passed a bill to adopt civil unions in Connecticut.  Connecticut's civil unions were identical to marriage and provided all of the same rights and responsibilities except for the title. Connecticut was the first state in the U.S. to voluntarily pass a same-sex civil unions law through the legislature without any immediate court intervention. The law was repealed on October 1, 2010, and replaced with a law making marriage gender-neutral.

Delaware
Delaware Governor Jack Markell signed a civil union bill on May 12, 2011, that establishes civil unions in the state effective January 1, 2012. The law was repealed on July 1, 2014, and replaced with a law making marriage gender-neutral.

District of Columbia

Same-sex marriage in the District of Columbia was legalized on December 18, 2009.  Marriage licenses became available on March 3, 2010, and marriages began on March 9, 2010. Domestic Partnerships in the District of Columbia (1992 law implemented, 2002 law came into effectexpanded over time to 2009)

Hawaii

Hawaii legalized civil unions for same-sex and opposite-sex couples on January 1, 2012. Same-sex marriage became legal on December 2, 2013.

Illinois
On December 1, 2010, the Illinois state senate passed SB1716the "Illinois Religious Freedom Protection and Civil Union Act"in a 32–24–1 vote, just one day after the Illinois House of Representatives did the same in a 61–52–2 vote. On January 31, 2011, Illinois state Governor Pat Quinn signed SB1716 into law, establishing civil unions for same-sex and opposite-sex couples. The new law came into effect on June 1, 2011.  The provision allowing opposite-sex couples to establish a civil union effectively doubles as a tool for widowed seniors to keep survivor's benefits from a marriage while gaining marital rights at the state level with another partner.

Maine

Maine legalized domestic partnership for same-sex and opposite-sex couples in 2004. Maine's domestic partnership registry only provides limited rights, most of which are geared toward protecting couples' security in emergency situations.

New Hampshire

On April 26, 2007, the New Hampshire General Court (state legislature) passed a civil union bill, and Governor John Lynch signed the bill into law on May 31, 2007. At the time, New Hampshire was "... the first state to embrace same-sex unions without a court order or the threat of one". The New Hampshire civil union legislation became effective on January 1, 2008. The law was replaced by the same-sex marriage law on January 1, 2010.

New Jersey

On October 25, 2006, the Supreme Court of New Jersey gave New Jersey lawmakers 180 days to rewrite the state's marriage laws, either including same-sex couples or creating a new system of civil unions for them. On December 14 the Legislature passed a bill establishing civil unions in New Jersey, which was signed into law by Governor Jon Corzine on December 21, 2006.  The first civil unions took place on February 19, 2007.

There are differences between civil unions and domestic partnerships.  In 2004, the state of New Jersey enacted a domestic partnership law, offering certain limited rights and benefits to same-sex and different-sex couples.  In 2006, however, after a state Supreme Court ruling that same-sex couples must be extended all the rights and benefits of marriage, the Legislature passed a civil unions law, effective in 2007, which is an attempt to satisfy the court's ruling.

Nevada
On May 31, 2009, the Nevada legislature overrode Governor Jim Gibbons' veto of a domestic partnership bill. The bill allows registered domestic partners, whether they are a same-sex or opposite-sex couple, to have most of the state level rights and responsibilities afforded to married couples. It does not require any other entity to provide rights or benefits afforded to married individuals. This has left the partnership bill ineffective compared to those of other states. The law took effect on 1 October 2009.

Oregon

Since 4 February 2008, Oregon offers domestic partnerships which grant nearly all of the state-recognized rights of marriage to same-sex couples.

Rhode Island

Civil unions were permitted in Rhode Island since July 1, 2011 until July 1, 2013.

Vermont

The controversial civil unions law that was passed in the Vermont General Assembly in 2000 was a response to the Vermont Supreme Court ruling in Baker v. Vermont, requiring that the state grant same-sex couples the same rights and privileges accorded to married couples under the law.

A Vermont civil union is nearly identical to a legal marriage, as far as the rights and responsibilities for which state law, not federal law, is responsible are concerned. It grants partners next-of-kin rights and other protections that heterosexual married couples also receive.  However, despite the "full faith and credit" clause of the United States Constitution, civil unions are generally not recognized outside Vermont in the absence of specific legislation.  Opponents of the law have supported the Defense of Marriage Act and the proposed Federal Marriage Amendment in order to prevent obligatory recognition of same-sex couples in other jurisdictions.  This means that many of the advantages of marriage, which fall in the federal jurisdiction (over 1,100 federal laws, such as joint federal income tax returns, visas and work permits for the foreign partner of a U.S. citizen, etc.), are not extended to the partners of a Vermont civil union.

Regarding voluntary recognition of the civil union in other jurisdictions, New York City's Domestic Partnership Law, passed in 2002, recognizes civil unions formalized in other jurisdictions. Germany's international civil law (EGBGB) also accords to Vermont civil unions the same benefits and responsibilities that apply in Vermont, as long as they do not exceed the standard accorded by German law to a German civil union. The law was replaced by the same-sex marriage law on September 1, 2009.

Washington

Washington offers domestic partnerships which grant nearly all of the state-recognized rights of marriage to same-sex couples. Washington is the first state to have passed a same-sex civil union bill by a popular vote.

Washington legalized same-sex marriage early in 2012, which provided that a couple in a civil union would have two years to convert their civil union to a marriage. The law was upheld by popular referendum in November 2012.

Uruguay

Civil unions in Uruguay were allowed nationwide from January 1, 2008.

National debates

International standards
To date, only two countries, Spain and Portugal, have signed onto the Convention on the Recognition of Registered Partnerships, a draft multilateral agreement on the status of civil, unmarried partnerships. The document is inclusive of rights for both same and opposite sex partnerships.

See also
 Civil marriage
 Cohabitation agreement
 Common-law marriage
 Convention on the recognition of registered partnerships
 Domestic partnership
 Free union
 LGBT rights
 Marriage privatization
 Nyumba ntobhu

References

External links
 The European Laboratory on Marriage and Registered Partnership
 The Vermont Guide to Civil Unions, Vermont Secretary of State
 Civil Union Fact Sheet, Australian Capital Territory web site
 Same-Sex Marriage, Civil Unions, and Domestic Partnerships topic page from The New York Times

Kinship and descent
Philosophy of love
Social institutions
State recognition of same-sex relationships